John Ledder (born 12 March 1937) is an Australian rower. He competed in the men's eight event at the 1960 Summer Olympics.

References

1937 births
Living people
Australian male rowers
Olympic rowers of Australia
Rowers at the 1960 Summer Olympics
Rowers from Western Australia
20th-century Australian people